Earsham was a railway station in Earsham, Norfolk, on the Waveney Valley Line, connecting Beccles with the Great Eastern Main Line which opened in 1860, and closed to passengers in 1953, and to goods services in 1960. It was not demolished, but lay derelict for many years before being converted into housing. The platform remains as do many original features.

References

External links
 Earsham station on navigable 1946 O. S. map

Disused railway stations in Norfolk
Former Great Eastern Railway stations
Railway stations in Great Britain opened in 1860
Railway stations in Great Britain closed in 1916
Railway stations in Great Britain opened in 1919
Railway stations in Great Britain closed in 1953